Hoành Sơn Range is a mountain range in the North Central Coast region of Vietnam. The range runs from Annamite Range to the South China Sea in southern Hà Tĩnh Province and northern Quảng Bình Province. It's the natural borderline of these two provinces. The length of this range is about 50 km. It crosses National Route 1 in Ngang Pass.

History
The Hoành Sơn mountains once served as a natural barrier between Dai Viet and Champa.

References

North Central Coast